Christians in Syria make up about 10% of the population. The country's largest Christian denomination is the Greek Orthodox Church of Antioch, closely followed by the Melkite Greek Catholic Church, an Eastern Catholic Churches that shares its roots with the Eastern Orthodox Church of Antioch, and then by Oriental Orthodox Churches such as Syriac Orthodox Church and Armenian Apostolic Church. There are also a minority of Protestants and members of the Assyrian Church of the East and Chaldean Catholic Church. The city of Aleppo is believed to have the largest number of Christians in Syria. In the late Ottoman rule, a large percentage of Syrian Christians emigrated from Syria, especially after the bloody chain of events that targeted Christians in particular in 1840, the 1860 massacre, and the Assyrian genocide. According to historian Philip Hitti, approximately 900,000 Syrians arrived in the United States between 1899 and 1919 (more than 90% of them Christians). The Syrians referred include historical Syria or the Levant encompassing Syria, Lebanon, Jordan and Palestine. Syrian Christians tend to be relatively wealthy and highly educated.

Origins

The Christian population of Syria comprise 10% of the population. In Syria today there around 1.2 million among their population in Syria in 2010 before the civil war started. Most Syrians are members of either the Greek Orthodox Church of Antioch (700,000), or the Syriac Orthodox Church. The vast majority of Catholics belong to the Melkite Greek Catholic Church, an Eastern Catholic church which was created as a result of a schism within the Greek Orthodox Church, largely over a disputed election to the Patriarchal See of Antioch in 1724. Other Eastern Catholic churches include the Maronite Church, Syriac Catholic Church, Armenian Catholic Church, Chaldeans Catholic Church; there is also a small number of Latin Church Catholics. The rest belong to the Eastern communions, which have existed in Syria since the earliest days of Christianity. The main Eastern groups are:
 the autonomous Eastern Orthodox churches;
 the Eastern Catholic Churches, which are in communion with Rome;
 and the independent Assyrian Church of the East (i.e., the "Nestorian" Church). Followers of the Assyrian Church of the East are almost all Eastern Aramaic speaking ethnic Assyrians/Syriacs whose origins lie in Mesopotamia, as are some Oriental Orthodox and Catholic Christians. Even though each group forms a separate community, Christians nevertheless cooperate increasingly. Roman Catholicism and Protestantism were introduced by missionaries but only a small number of Syrians are members of Western denominations.

The schisms that brought about the many sects resulted from political and doctrinal disagreements. The doctrine most commonly at issue was the nature of Christ. In 431, the Nestorians were separated from the main body of the Church because of their belief in the dual character of Christ, i.e., that he had two distinct but inseparable "qnoma" (ܩܢܘܡܐ, close in meaning to, but not exactly the same as, hypostasis), the human Jesus and the divine Logos. Therefore, according to Nestorian belief, Mary was not the mother of God but only of the man Jesus. The Council of Chalcedon, representing the mainstream of Christianity, in 451 confirmed the dual nature of Christ in one person; Mary was therefore the mother of a single person, mystically and simultaneously both human and divine. The Miaphysites taught that the Logos took on an instance of humanity as His own in one nature. They were the precursors of the present-day Syrian and Armenian Orthodox churches.

By the thirteenth century, breaks had developed between Eastern or Greek Christianity and Western or Latin Christianity. In the following centuries, however, especially during the Crusades, some of the Eastern churches professed the authority of the pope in Rome and entered into or re-affirmed communion with the Catholic Church. Today called the Eastern Catholic churches, they retain a distinctive language, canon law and liturgy.

Eastern Orthodoxy

The largest Christian denomination in Syria is the Greek Orthodox Church of Antioch (officially named the Orthodox Patriarchate of Antioch and All the East), also known as the Melkite church after the 5th and 6th century Christian schisms, in which its clergy remained loyal to the Eastern Roman Emperor ("melek") of Constantinople.

Adherents of that denomination generally call themselves "Rūm" which means "Eastern Romans" or "Asian Greeks" in Arabic. In that particular context, the term "Rūm" is used in preference to "Yūnāniyyūn" which means "European Greeks" or Ionians in Classical Arabic. The appellation "Greek" refers to the Koine Greek liturgy used in their traditional prayers and priestly rites.

Members of the community sometimes also call themselves "Melkites", which literally means "supporters of the emperor" in Semitic languages - a reference to their past allegiance to Roman and Byzantine imperial rule. But, in the modern era, this designation tends to be more commonly used by followers of the local Melkite Catholic Church.

Syrians from the Greek Orthodox Community are also present in the Hatay Province of Southern Turkey (bordering Northern Syria), and have been well represented within the Syrian diasporas of Brazil, Argentina, Mexico, the United States, Canada and Australia.

Oriental Orthodoxy
Traditional Christianity in Syria is also represented by Oriental Orthodox communities, that primarily belong to the ancient Syriac Orthodox Church, and also to the Armenian Apostolic Church.

Syriac Orthodox Church

The Syriac Orthodox Church is the largest Oriental Orthodox Christian group in Syria. The Syriac Orthodox or Jacobite Church, whose liturgy is in Syriac, was severed from the favored church of the Byzantine Empire (Eastern Orthodoxy), over the Chalcedonian controversy.

Armenian Apostolic Church

The Armenian Apostolic Church is the second largest Oriental Orthodox Christian group in Syria. It uses an Armenian liturgy and its doctrine is Miaphysite (not monophysite, which is a mistaken term used or was used by the Chalcedonian Catholics and Chalcedonian Orthodox).

Catholic Church

Of the Eastern Catholic Churches the oldest is the Maronite, with ties to Rome dating at least from the twelfth century. Their status before then is unclear, some claiming it originally held to the Monothelite heresy up until 1215, while the Maronite Church claims it has always been in union with Rome. The liturgy is in Aramaic (Syriac).
The Patriarchate of Antioch never recognized the mutual excommunications of Rome and Constantinople of 1054, so it was canonically still in union with both. After a disputed patriarchal election in 1724, it divided into two groups, one in union with Rome and the other with Constantinople. The term "Melkite" is in use mostly in reference to the Melkite Greek Catholic Church. Like its sister-church the Greek Orthodox Church of Antioch ('Eastern Orthodox'), the Melkite Catholics both Greek and Arabic in its form of the liturgy. Most of the 375,000 Catholics in Syria belong to the Melkite Greek Catholic Church, the rest are members of the Latin Church, Maronites (52,000), Armenian or Syriac Rites.

Popes of the Catholic Church
Seven popes from Syria ascended the papal throne. Many of them lived in Italy. Pope Gregory III, was the last pope born outside Europe before Francis (elected in 2013).

Protestant Churches
In Syria, there is also a minority of Protestants. Protestantism was introduced by European missionaries and a small number of Syrians are members of Protestant denominations. The Gustav-Adolf-Werk (GAW) as the Evangelical Church in Germany Diaspora agency actively supports persecuted Protestant Christians in Syria with aid projects. A 2015 study estimates some 2,000 Muslim converted to Christianity in Syria, most of them belonging to some form of Protestantism.

By one estimate made by Elisabe Granli from University of Oslo, around 1,920 Syrian Druze converted to Christianity, according to the same study Christian of Druze background (Druze converts to Christianity) still regard themselves as Druze, and they claims that there is no contradiction between being Druze and being Christian.

Demographics

The number of Christians in Syria has been disputed for many decades. There has been no official census on Religion in Syria since the sixties.

Status of Christians in Syria
Damascus was one of the first regions to receive Christianity during the ministry of St Peter. There were more Christians in Damascus than anywhere else. With the military expansion of the Islamic Umayyad empire into Syria and Anatolia, non-Muslims who retained their native faiths were required to pay a tax (jizya) equivalent to the Islamic Zakat, and were permitted to own land; they were, however, not eligible for Islamic social welfare as Muslims were.

Damascus still contains a sizeable proportion of Christians, with some churches all over the city, but particularly in the district of Bab Touma (The Gate of Thomas in Aramaic and Arabic). Masses are held every Sunday and civil servants are given Sunday mornings off to allow them to attend church, even though Sunday is a working day in Syria. Schools in Christian-dominated districts have Saturday and Sunday as the weekend, while the official Syrian weekend falls on Friday and Saturday.

Integration

Christians engage in every aspect of Syrian life and Syrian Christians are relatively wealthy and more highly educated than other Syrian religious groups. Following in the traditions of Paul, who practiced his preaching and ministry in the marketplace, Syrian Christians are participants in the economy, the academic, scientific, engineering, arts, and intellectual life, entertainment, and the Politics of Syria. Many Syrian Christians are public sector and private sector managers and directors, while some are local administrators, members of Parliament, and ministers in the government. A number of Syrian Christians are also officers in the armed forces of Syria. They have preferred to mix in with Muslims rather than form all-Christian units and brigades, and fought alongside their Muslim compatriots against Israeli forces in the various Arab–Israeli conflicts of the 20th century. In addition to their daily work, Syrian Christians also participate in volunteer activities in the less developed areas of Syria. As a result, Syrian Christians are generally viewed by other Syrians as an asset to the larger community.
In September 2017, the deputy Hammouda Sabbagh, a Syriac Orthodox Christian and member of the Ba'ath Party, was elected speaker of parliament with 193 votes out of 252.

Separation
Syrian Christians are more urbanized than Muslims; many live either in or around Damascus, Aleppo, Homs, Hama, or Latakia. In the 18th century, Christians were relatively wealthier than Muslims in Aleppo. Syrian Christians have their own courts that deal with civil cases like marriage, divorce and inheritance based on Bible teachings.

The Constitution of Syria states that the President of Syria has to be a Muslim; this was as a result of popular demand at the time the constitution was written. However, Syria does not profess a state religion.

On 31 January 1973, Hafez al-Assad implemented the new constitution (after reaching power through a military coup in 1970), which led to a national crisis. Unlike previous constitutions, this one did not require that the  president of Syria to be of the Islamic faith, leading to fierce demonstrations in Hama, Homs and Aleppo organized by the Muslim Brotherhood and the ulama. They labeled Assad as the "enemy of Allah" and called for a jihad against his rule. Robert D. Kaplan has compared Assad's coming to power to "a Jew becoming tsar in Russia—an unprecedented development shocking to the Sunni majority population which had monopolized power for so many centuries."

The government survived a series of armed revolts by Islamists, mainly members of the Muslim Brotherhood, from 1976 until 1982.

Christian cities/areas
Christians spread throughout Syria and have sizable populations in some cities/areas; important cities/areas are:

 Aleppo – has the largest Christian population of various denominations (mostly ethnic Armenians and Assyrian/Syriac. Also members of Greek Orthodox Church of Antioch and Melkite Catholic Church)
 Damascus – contains sizable Christian communities of all Christian denominations represented in the country
 Homs – has the second largest Christian population (mostly members of Greek Orthodox Church of Antioch)
 Wadi al-Nasara or Valley of Christians – has a sizable Christian population in the area (mostly members of Greek Orthodox Church of Antioch)
 Safita - has a sizable Christian population (mostly members of Greek Orthodox Church of Antioch)
 Maaloula – has a sizable Christian population (mostly members of Greek Orthodox Church of Antioch and Melkite Catholic Church)
 Saidnaya – has a sizable Christian population (mostly members of Greek Orthodox Church of Antioch)
 Tartous – has a sizable Christian population (mostly members of Greek Orthodox Church of Antioch)
 Latakia – has a sizable Christian population (mostly members of Greek Orthodox Church of Antioch)
 Suwayda – has a sizable Christian population (mostly members of Greek Orthodox Church of Antioch)
 Al-Hasakah – has a large ethnic Assyrian/Syriac population (mostly members of Syriac Orthodox Church)
 Qamishli – has a large ethnic Assyrian/Syriac population (mostly members of Syriac Orthodox Church)
 Khabur River – 35 villages has a large ethnic Assyrian/Syriac population (mostly members of Assyrian Church of the East)
 Hama Governorate – has a number of Christian towns/cities/villages (Maharda, Al-Suqaylabiyah, Kafr Buhum, Toumin, Ayyo, Al-Biyah, Ain Halaqim, Barshin, Al-Bayda, Hazzour). Christians also live in the city of Hama
 Idlib Governorate – has five Christian villages (Al-Quniyah, Al-Yacoubiyah, Judayda, Hallouz and Al-Ghassaniyah). Christians also live in the cities of Idlib and Jisser al-Shughour.

Syrian Christians during the Syrian Civil War

Syrian Christians, in line with their fellow citizens, have been badly affected by the Syrian Civil War. According to Syrian law, all Syrian men of adult age with brothers are eligible for military conscription, including Christians.
Since the outbreak of the Syrian Civil War in 2011, 300,000 to 900,000 Christians have left the country, but as the situation began to stabilize in 2017 following recent army gains, return of electricity and water to many areas and stability returning to many government controlled regions, some Christians began returning to Syria, most notably in the city of Homs.
During the Syrian civil war, several attacks by ISIS have targeted Syrian Christians, including the 2015 al-Qamishli bombings and the July 2016 Qamishli bombings. In January 2016, YPG militias conducted a surprise attack on Assyrian checkpoints in Qamishli, in a predominantly Assyrian area, killing one Assyrian and wounding three others.
More than 120 churches and Christian places of worship have been destroyed since the Syrian civil war began in 2011.
In November 2021, the Armenian Catholic Church of the Martyrs in Raqqa’s city center was rebuilt by the aid group called the Free Burma Rangers.

Following a visit to Syria, to participante in a conference that brought together representatives of the Syrian churches and NGOs working with them in the country, Regina Lynch, project director for Aid to the Church in Need, described the difficult situation the local communities endure, but added that "for many Christians, the war has had a positive effect on the faith, and, in spite of everything, it has been an opportunity for the Church to put its teaching on charity and forgiveness into action".

Notable Christians
 George Sabra, member of Syrian opposition.
 Philip Stamma, chess player
 Fares al-Khoury, Prime Minister of Syria (1944-1945) and (1954-1955)
 Mikhail Ilyan, Minister of Foregin affairs (1945)
 Michel Aflaq, philosopher and politician
 Dawoud Rajiha, Minister of Defence (2011-2012)
 Ibrahim Haddad, Minister of Oil and Mineral Reserves (2001-2006)
 Sami al-Jundi, politician
 Mikhail Wehbe, Permanent Representative of Syria to the United Nations (1996-2003)
 Hammouda Sabbagh, Speaker of the People's Council of Syria since 2017
 Yohanna Ibrahim, Syriac Orthodox Archbishop and kidnapping victim
 Paul (Yazigi) of Aleppo, Greek Orthodox Archbishop and kidnapping victim
 Paul of Aleppo, chronicler
 Maxim Khalil, actor
 Bassem Yakhour, actor 
 George Tutunjian, musician
 Lena Chamamyan, singer
 Faia Younan, singer
 Nouri Iskandar, composer

See also
 Arab Christians
 Christianity and Islam
 Christianity in the Middle East
 Religion in the Middle East
 Genocide of Christians by the Islamic State
 Sectarianism and minorities in the Syrian Civil War
 1860 civil conflict in Mount Lebanon and Damascus
 Massacre of Aleppo (1850)
 Great Famine of Mount Lebanon (1915–1918)
 Late Ottoman genocides
 Religion in Syria
 Freedom of religion in Syria
 Catholic Church in Syria
 Eastern Orthodoxy in Syria
 List of monasteries in Syria
 List of churches in Aleppo
 St Baradates

References

Further reading

External links
 European Centre for Law and Justice (2011): The Persecution of Oriental Christians, what answer from Europe?

 
Religion in Syria
Syrian Christians
Middle Eastern Christians